Hernán Fernández can refer to:

 Hernán Fernández (Argentine footballer)
 Hernán Fernández (Chilean footballer)